Hiyori (written: ひより or 日和) is a feminine Japanese given name. Notable people with the name include:

, Japanese amateur sumo wrestler
, Japanese voice actress
, Japanese voice actress
, Japanese actress

Fictional characters
, a character in the manga series Noragami
, a character in the anime film Heaven's Lost Property the Movie: The Angeloid of Clockwork
, a character in the manga series Hiyokoi
, a character in the manga series Bleach
, a character in the manga series Lucky Star
, a character in the manga series One Piece
, a character in the game and anime Ensemble Stars!!

Japanese feminine given names